Star of the North or variation, may refer to:

Places
 Polaris, the star
 Star of the North Secondary Charter School, Fairbanks North Star Borough School District, Fairbanks, Alaska, USA
 Star of the North Inn, Old New England Highway, Liddell, Singleton Council, New South Wales, Australia; former name of the Chain of Ponds Inn

People
 Star of the North, a nickname of Catherine the Great (1729–1796), Tsarina of Russia
 The Star of the North, a nickname of George Gilfillan (1813–1878), Scottish writer
 Star of the North, a nickname of William Nicolson (1655–1727), English clergyman

Entertainment
 Star of the North (film) a 1914 U.S. silent film
 Airhawk (film), a 1981 Australian telefilm also released as "Star of the North"
 Star of the North (book), a novel by Anna Jacobs

Ships
 Star of the North, a British ship that ran aground off Norfolk; see List of shipwrecks in June 1859
 Star of the North, a British ship that wrecked off Greece; see List of shipwrecks in October 1863
 Star of the North, a U.S. ship that sank in Michigan; see List of shipwrecks in 1886
 Star of the North, a British steam trawler built by Hall, Russell & Company; see List of ships built by Hall, Russell & Company (301-400)

Other uses
 Order of the Star of the North, a Swedish chivalric order
 "Star of the North", the motto for the 205th Infantry Brigade (United States)
 "Star of the North", a symbol of Minnesota; see List of Minnesota state symbols
 Star of the North Games, the Minneosta State Games, part of the National Congress of State Games
 Latający Wilnianin, a Polish train service also called "Star of the North"

See also

 Star (disambiguation)
 North (disambiguation)
 Estrella del norte (disambiguation)
 Estrela do Norte (disambiguation)
 Étoile du Nord (disambiguation)
 Nordstern (disambiguation)
 Nordstar (disambiguation)
 Northstar (disambiguation)
 North Star (disambiguation)
 Northern Star (disambiguation)